Juan Garat may refer to:

Juan Garat (tennis) (born 1973), Argentine tennis player
Juan Pablo Garat (born 1983), Argentine footballer